What Was Left is the second studio album by Clare Bowditch and the Feeding Set. It was released in October 2005 through Capitol.

At the J Award of 2005, the album was nominated for Australian Album of the Year.

At the ARIA Music Awards of 2006, Bowditch won the ARIA Award for Best Female Artist.

Track listing
 "Starry Picking Night" - 5:52
 "Lips Like Oranges" -	3:57
 "I Thought You Were God" - 4:30
 "Winding Up" - 3:24
 "Divorcee By 23" - 3:40
 "Which Way to Go" - 4:10
 "The Thing About Grief" - 4:44
 "Strange Questions" - 6:15
 "When I Was Five" - 4:32
 "Little Self Centred Queen" - 3:01
 "Just Might Do" - 4:04
 "On This Side" - 4:03
 "Yes I Miss You Like the Rain" - 2:09

 Bonus Disc (Loose Acoustic One Takes)
 "Good Grief" (Unreleased Track)	
 "Divorcee By 23"	
 "Empty Pockets" (Red Raku Number)	
 "Buddy" (From Autumn Bone)	
 "I Thought You Were God"

Charts

Release history

Personnel
 Clare Bowditch – vocals
Marty Brown (Art of Fighting) – drums
J Walker (Machine Translations) – guitar
Libby Chow – French horn, vocals
Warren Bloomer – bass guitar

References 

Clare Bowditch and the Feeding Set albums
2005 albums
ARIA Award-winning albums